John DeWolf (or D'Wolf; March 18, 1760 – October 10, 1841) was an American slave-trader, farmer, and justice of the Rhode Island Supreme Court from May 1818 to May 1819, appointed from Bristol, Rhode Island.

Born in Bristol, Rhode Island, DeWolf was the ninth child of Mark Anthony DeWolf, descended from one of the settlers of the colony. He fought in the American Revolutionary War, and afterwards was a sea captain involved in the American slave trade. He retired from the sea around 1798, and became a successful farmer. He was elected to the Rhode Island General Assembly in 1808. On May 8, 1818, the Rhode Island General Assembly replaced the existing judiciary with a contingent composed of five new members, all Democrats, including DeWolf. After serving on the court, he returned to his private commercial ventures.

DeWolf died in Bristol at the age of 82.

References

1760 births
1841 deaths
People from Bristol, Rhode Island
American slave traders
Democratic Party members of the Rhode Island House of Representatives
Justices of the Rhode Island Supreme Court